Lee Khoon Choy  ( 24 January 1924 – 27 February 2016) was a Singaporean politician. A member of the governing People's Action Party, he was the Member of Parliament for   Braddell Heights SMC between 1977 and 1984, and Hong Lim SMC between 1965 and 1976.

Early life and education
Lee was born in 1924 in Butterworth, Penang, and was educated at Yeok Keow Chinese School and Chung Ling High School in George Town, Penang.

During the Japanese occupation of Penang, he took refuge in his uncle's farm located in a jungle.

He left Singapore for London in 1949 to study journalism at Regent Street Polytechnic on a year long scholarship.

Career
In 1946 Lee commenced a career in journalism in Penang with Sin Pin Jit Poh, then left for Singapore to work for a number of Chinese (Sin Chew Jit Poh, Nanyang Siang Pau) and English (Singapore Tiger Standard) newspapers before culminating in his working for The Straits Times in 1957.

Politics

Member of Parliament
Resigning in 1959, Lee commenced his political career and was elected to the legislative assembly. He served as Minister of State for Culture, Minister of State in the Prime Minister's Office (PMO), Senior Minister of State for Foreign Affairs, and Senior Minister of State in PMO. He stepped down from his parliamentary positions in 1984.

Diplomat
In 1968 he commenced his diplomatic career, serving as Singapore's Ambassador to Egypt, Ethiopia, Yugoslavia, Lebanon and Indonesia, and High Commissioner in Pakistan. On stepping down from Parliament, he served as Singapore's Ambassador to Japan and South Korea.

Post politics
He retired from public service in 1988, founding his own firm, Eng Lee Investment Consultants, in 1990.

He has been and is a director of a number of companies. He is currently Chairman of Eng Lee Investment Consultants, and an Independent non-executive director of Koh Brothers Group Ltd. Previous positions held include:
Chairman, Sino-American (UIC) Tours Corporation
Independent director, Metro Holdings
Non-Executive chairman, SSH Corporation (formerly known as Sin Soon Huat)
Independent director, L & M Group Investments

Bibliography
Lee has published ten books, including:
Lee, Khoon Choy (2013) 
Lee, Khoon Choy (2005) 
Lee, Khoon Choy (1999) A fragile nation: the Indonesian crisis. World Scientific Publishing.
Lee, Khoon Choy (1995) Japan: Between Myth and Reality. World Scientific Publishing. , 9789810218652.
Lee, Khoon Choy (1993) Diplomacy of a Tiny State. World Scientific Publishing. .
Lee, Khoon Choy (1976) Indonesia: Between Myth and Reality.

Personal life
Lee married Florence Khor Swee Hoon, and they had two sons. Khor died of cancer at age 30 in 1959. In 1962 he married Eng Ah Siam, with whom he has had five daughters.

Lee died in his sleep at home aged 92, at 3am on 27 February 2016. He is survived by his second wife, seven children and 11 grandchildren.

Honours and awards
1974: (Indonesian) Bintang Bakti Utama (Meritorious Service Star) for his work in enhancing relations between Indonesia and Singapore.
1986: The Scholarly Achievement Award by the Japan Institute of Oriental Philosophy for his achievements in the research and development of eastern philosophy, thought and culture.
1988: (South Korean) Order of Diplomatic Service Merit for his service in promoting relations between South Korea and Singapore.
1990: (Singaporean) Darjah Utama Bakti Cemerlang (Distinguished Service Order) in recognition of his contributions.
1997: Made an honorary member of the Chinese National Academy of Social Sciences in Beijing for his contributions in the field of humanities and social sciences.

References

External links
Lee Khoon Choy's website
The Lee Khoon Choy Collection at the National Library of Singapore comprises monographs, periodicals and documents pertaining to East Asian culture, art and history. These were acquired from his years of travel around the globe as a journalist, politician, artist and author. Collection Highlights: 

Recipients of the Darjah Utama Bakti Cemerlang
Singaporean journalists
Malaysian journalists
Singaporean diplomats
Ambassadors of Singapore to Egypt
Ambassadors of Singapore to Ethiopia
Ambassadors of Singapore to Yugoslavia
Ambassadors of Singapore to Lebanon
Ambassadors of Singapore to Indonesia
Ambassadors of Singapore to Japan
Ambassadors of Singapore to South Korea
High Commissioners of Singapore to Pakistan
Members of the Parliament of Singapore
1924 births
2016 deaths
Singaporean people of Hakka descent
Malaysian emigrants to Singapore
People who lost Malaysian citizenship
Naturalised citizens of Singapore
People from Meixian District
Hakka writers
People's Action Party politicians